The Real Estate Regulatory Agency (RERA) is a government agency to regulate the real estate sector in Dubai, the governmental Dubai Land Department. It's a head agency which forms, regulates and authorizes the real estate sector in Dubai. RERA was founded on 31 July 2007 by His Highness Sheikh Mohammed Bin Rashid Al Maktoum, Vice President and Prime Minister of the United Arab Emirates and Ruler of Dubai.

Aims of founding
To set policies and plans in the real estate sector in Dubai in order to increase foreign investments. RERA is a part of Dubai Land Resources Department. The agency has its own financial and administrative independence with full legal authority to regulate the real estate sector in Dubai.

RERA provides transparence and effectiveness of legal framework, when everyone involved in the property market can conduct a business. In this concept RERA aims to develop an on-line society for investors, developers and buyers, as well as for supporting sectors (banks, law firm and insurance companies) could cooperate with each other and with RERA.

Responsibilities
 licensing all real estate activities
 managing real estate developers' trust account
 licensing real estate agents
 regulating and registering rental agreements
 regulating and supervising the owners associations
 regulating real estate advertisements in the Mass media
 regulating and licensing real estate exhibitions
 publishing studies for the sector
 enhancing national participation in the real estate sector

RERA also informs people on regulatory acts when buying and renting the real estate in Dubai. Land resources can be in security until the building up is finished. The land can be divided but only after a certain approval according local planning. The land given cannot be either bought nor sold until the written direction of His Highness Sheikh Mohammed Bin Rashed Al Maktoum is received. According to the policy of confidentiality the Dubai Land Department doesn't publish any information about its clients. Information about the land conditions can be given when the Dubai Land Department studies the condition of Land relations.

In November 2013, Dubai Land Department launched an online real estate portal designed for sale, rental and auctions of properties, as well as for exchanging private and public real estate information.

Management
The director of the agency is Marwan Bin Galita.

Approved developers
List of the approved developers can be found on the Dubai Land Department website

See also
 Ajman Real Estate Regulatory Agency

References

Government agencies of Dubai
Real estate in the United Arab Emirates